The President George Bush Turnpike (PGBT) is a  toll road running through the northern, northeastern and western suburbs, forming a partial loop around Dallas, Texas, United States. It is named for the late George H. W. Bush, the 41st president of the United States. At its west end near Belt Line Road in Irving, State Highway 161 (SH 161) continues southwest to Interstate 20 (I-20) in Grand Prairie. The discontinuous free frontage roads along the turnpike from I-35E in Carrollton east to its end at I-30 in Garland are assigned the State Highway 190 (SH 190) designation. SH 190 signage appears only along the Rowlett, Garland, Richardson, Plano, and Carrollton sections of the frontage road with the undersign "frontage road only". At intersections with city streets, only the Bush Turnpike signs are displayed, not the SH 190 signage. Prior to the construction of the main lanes as a tollway, SH 190 was used as the name of the planned main lanes too. Similarly, the part west of I-35E was planned as part of SH 161. Bush Turnpike is signed as a north–south road from I-20 to I-35E (the "Western Extension"), an east–west road from I-35E to the Merritt Main Lane Gantry (the original sections) and as a north–south road from the Merritt Main Lane Gantry to I-30 (the "Eastern Extension"), as Bush Turnpike makes a nearly 90-degree curve in both places.

The turnpike is operated by the North Texas Tollway Authority (NTTA). Currently, all maintenance is done under a five-year total routine maintenance (TRM) contract with Roy Jorgensen Associates, Inc. based in Buckeystown, Maryland, that started in November 2011.

The turnpike passes through three Texas counties (Dallas, Collin and Denton) and nine Dallas suburbs (Rowlett, Sachse, Garland, Richardson, Plano, Carrollton, Farmers Branch, Irving, and Grand Prairie).

Originally the PGBT was equipped with traditional toll plazas for cash payment as well as RFID-based TollTag express lanes. However, on July 1, 2009, the cash plazas were closed and replaced with "ZipCash", an OCR-based camera system which reads the license plate and bills the owner by mail. This made the turnpike the first in the United States to transition to all-electronic toll collection. The ZipCash rates, however, come at a premium being significantly higher than both the TollTag rate and the earlier cash prices.

History 
The corridor of SH 161 and the Turnpike was first proposed as an outer loop within Dallas County in 1957. The 1964 plan was the first to designate it as a freeway, and in 1969 the full loop was added to the state highway system as Loop 9. The loop would begin at Interstate 20 just east of the Tarrant County line and head north (along a corridor still planned as an extension of SH 161). From State Highway 183 it would run roughly along present SH 161, turning north on Belt Line Road and east just south of the Denton County line, crossing Interstate 35E near the present junction. Rather than cross into Denton and Tarrant Counties, the loop would stay in Dallas County, running roughly where Campbell Road is now. It would rejoin the present Turnpike alignment and head southeast to Interstate 30 west of Lake Ray Hubbard. The south part of the loop would continue in a roughly circular route to end at the junction of Interstate 20 and Spur 408, several miles east of the beginning of the loop. The short Spur 484, designated in 1970, would run from Loop 9 at Belt Line Road northeast along the present Turnpike alignment to Interstate 635.

Some of the opposition to the loop came from the city of Richardson, which was already divided by the Central Expressway. In conjunction with Plano, the city acquired empty right-of-way about two miles (3 km) to the north, where the Turnpike now runs, and set the centerline of the right-of-way to the border between Richardson and Plano.

Loop 9 was cancelled on October 1, 1977, and the western and northern section was split between two new designations: State Highway 161 from Interstate 20 to State Highway 114 (at Belt Line Road) and State Highway 190 from Interstate 35E to State Highway 78. (The piece between SH 114 and IH 35E was removed from the state highway system.) Spur 484 was absorbed into SH 161 on October 31, 1979, making its northern terminus Interstate 635 (at Valley View Lane). The connection between I-635 and I-35E was added to SH 161 on August 30, 1988.

Construction on service roads began in late 1988 in north Garland and Richardson.  A stack interchange was constructed in 1990 at U.S. Highway 75 in Richardson, which quickly became a white elephant as the structure remained abandoned for several years. On January 29, 1991, SH 190 was extended to I-20. In 1995 following a revision in federal laws, authorities agreed to shift to a toll financing scheme, providing an infusion of cash and new construction. The SH 190 designation was removed from the plans for the not-yet-constructed main lanes on October 26, 1995, and SH 190 was truncated to SH 78. and on April 30, 1998, SH 161 was removed from the piece between Belt Line Road and I-635 (Segment V). On April 26, 2007, SH 190 extended to I-30.

SH 161 was also the name of a route designated on March 19, 1930, from Clairemont southeastward to SH 70 near Rotan as a renumbering of SH 84A. That route was transferred to SH 70 on December 1, 1930, but was not cancelled until January 22, 1931.

SH 190 was also the name of a route designated on November 30, 1932, from Cuero southwestward to SH 119. That route was transferred to SH 29 on March 13, 1934.

At Dallas North Tollway, the interchange had been built in 1994 ready for the turnpike to be built in 1998.

In late December 2015, the PGBT and the I-30 interchange was directly hit by a large, EF4 tornado with winds of up to 180 mph while at peak strength at around 6:52pm CDT. The tornado lofted several cars driving on the interchange bridges and threw them several hundred yards, with some of the cars being found in Lake Ray Hubbard in the following weeks. Multiple cars were mangled beyond recognition and several fatalities occurred on the interchange.

Description 

Since the initial construction began in 1988, the turnpike was completed in a number of phases, as described here:

Segment I (North Dallas).  Extends from Campbell Road to Midway Road, and includes the Dallas North Tollway and U.S. Highway 75 (Central Expressway) interchanges. Opened in December 1998 (Midway Road to Preston Road) and December 1999 (Preston Road to Campbell Road).

Segment II (Garland/Richardson). Extends from Campbell Road to State Highway 78. Opened in 2000.

Segment III (Carrollton). Extends from Midway Road in north Dallas to Interstate 35E. Opened July 2001.

Segment IV ("PGBT Superconnector"). Connects I-35E to the I-635 airport extension. Much of the expense is because the segment is built within the Trinity River wetland and comprises many miles of bridges. Construction began in January 2003 and was completed in October 2005.

Segment V (Irving). A  segment connecting the I-635 airport extension to the SH 161 freeway near Belt Line Road. It opened in December 2001. Unstable clay soil was a significant problem in this segment, requiring contractors to use concentrated liquid stabilizers and geosynthetic reinforcement. A part of President George Bush Turnpike was extended from SH 183 to Conflans Road in 2006.

Segment VI ("Western Extension", Irving/Grand Prairie). A  extension south from SH-183 in Irving to I-30 in Grand Prairie.  A portion of the Western Extension, from SH-183 to I-30 in Grand Prairie, opened in August 2009.  The remaining  of the Western Extension, from I-30 to I-20 in Grand Prairie, opened in October 2012.

Segment VII ("Eastern Extension", Garland/Sachse/Rowlett). A  extension from SH-78 in Garland, through Rowlett and Sachse, and back into Garland at I-30.  The project, with a price tag of $1.04 billion, included construction of a 1-mile bridge at Lake Ray Hubbard.  Construction began in October 2008, and the Eastern Extension opened to traffic on December 21, 2011.

Segment VIII ("East Branch", Garland/Mesquite). A proposed extension from I-30 in Garland to I-20 in Mesquite, with an estimated cost of $730 million.  In December 2015 an Environmental Impact Statement for the East Branch had been prepared but the review process was restarted in 2017. Construction is not expected until 2026.

Expansion plans 
The next PGBT segment, the East Branch extension, is planned to begin at the PGBT Lake Ray Hubbard Interchange at I-30, extending south-southeast to near Duck Creek Way, then southward near Mesquite Metro Airport, terminating at I-20 near Rory Galloway Day Camp.  The project is well into the planning stages, and an Environmental Impact Statement was under preparation . In May 2017 at a Dallas city council meeting it was stated TxDOT had restarted the environmental impact statement review process.  Construction is not expected until 2026.

In the longer term, the North Central Texas Council of Governments is studying a very broad outer loop around the entire Dallas–Fort Worth metroplex.  Assuming it receives environmental clearance, funding, and political support, much of it would be completed in the 2020s or 2030s.  The PGBT is not part of this outer loop, but the PGBT East Branch alignment was closely coordinated with the loop's master plan.  The segment of the proposed outer loop through southern Dallas County would be known as Loop 9 and would likely be the first segment to be built.

Exit list

References

External links 

North Texas Tollway Authority
Texas Department of Transportation - SH 161 (southern extension)
Texas Freeways: State Highway 190
Section 32 Web site | Before and after images of SH 190 Eastern Extension construction

Bush
Toll roads in Texas
Transportation in Dallas County, Texas
Transportation in Denton County, Texas
Transportation in Collin County, Texas